Anarsia lineatella, the peach twig borer,  is a moth of the family Gelechiidae. It is commonly found in Europe, but was introduced to California in the 1880s.

The wingspan is 11–14 mm. The moths are on wing from June to August depending on the location.

The larvae feed on Prunus species, including Prunus avium, Prunus spinosa, Prunus domestica and Prunus insititia. In California, A. lineatella is a significant pest of local almond plantations.

References

External links 
 Ukmoths

lineatella
Moths described in 1839
Moths of Europe